Dealers is a 1989 British film directed by Colin Bucksey. It stars Paul McGann and Rebecca De Mornay.

Plot

Based at the London branch of Whitney Paine, a fictional American investment bank; possibly a play on the names of Paine Webber and Dean Witter.

Cast
Paul McGann as Daniel Pascoe
Rebecca De Mornay as Anna Schuman
Derrick O'Connor as Robbie Barrell
John Castle as Frank Mallory
Paul Guilfoyle as Lee Peters
Adrian Dunbar as Lennon Mayhew
Sara Sugarman as Elana

Reception

Dealers received a fairly mixed response from American critics at the Austin Texas film festival, some describing it as 'poorly acted' and 'poorly scripted', with others describing it as having an 'edge-of-your-seat climax'. The film was popular among university students.
However the film was extremely popular by the very people it protagonised and herofied for ever. Risk taking "propriety traders" or "prop traders"
In "the City" where it was based, London's Financial "Square Mile" it became an instant "must see" by city gents and city girls mostly because of its incredible attention to detail but also by the fact the realistic roller coaster tension took your breath away and that by comparison left "the other film" in its wake. It was regarded as a slice of (a bygone) life, of over-the-phone, over-the-counter bond dealing, high salary, high bonus, trading floor culture. A brokerage house and investment bank little known but cult classic. An epic that captures the essence of the "wheeler dealer".

Production

The dealing room itself was so meticulously well done, costing a rumoured one million pounds, that it was kept intact and reused for a UK television series, called Capital City (TV series) which successfully capitalised on the post Wall Street, trendy City Job, City Lifestyle. Both film and TV series being produced by Euston Films. One visible change for its reuse were the three prominent clocks over the door to the trading room; 'Frankfurt', 'London' and 'New York' instead became 'London','New York' and 'Tokyo'.

External links

1989 films
1989 crime drama films
British drama films
Films set in London
Films shot at Pinewood Studios
Trading films
1980s English-language films
1980s British films